Baha'ud'din Mohiuddin Dagar (born 1970) is the rudra veena player and son of famous north Indian musician Zia Mohiuddin Dagar. He plays rudra veena with the dagarbani style. He represents the 20th generation of Dagar lineage, referring to Nayak Haridas Dagar of the 16th century. However, he traces his ancestry to Baba Gopal Das, who converted to Islam, and became Baba Imam Baksh in the 18th century, making him the representative of the 8th generation.

Awards and recognition
In 2012, he was awarded the Sangeet Natak Akademi Award, the highest award for performing artists, conferred by the Sangeet Natak Akademi, India's National Academy for Music, Dance and Drama.

Early life and training
Dagar started learning the veena from his father Zia Mohiuddin Dagar when he was 12 years old. After the death of his father in 1990, he continued his training under his uncle Zia Fariddudin Dagar.

References

1970 births
Dagarvani
Hindustani instrumentalists
Living people
Date of birth missing (living people)
Place of birth missing (living people)
Rudra veena players
Indian male classical musicians
Recipients of the Sangeet Natak Akademi Award
Articles containing video clips